The Golden Sahara II or Concept Goodyear Golden Sahara II is a futuristic concept car designed by American custom car designer George Barris, based on the 1953 Lincoln Capri, presented at the Petersen Motorama show in Los Angeles in 1954 and upgraded to Version II in 1956.

History 
The American custom car designer George Barris designs this Golden Sahara prototype based on the damaged engine chassis of his personal 1953 Lincoln Capri, with a 200 hp V8 engine.

The design is inspired by the jet era and futuristic Batmobiles of the 1950s, with glazed cockpit of a 1953 Lincoln Capri, luxurious interior, gold-plated interior and exterior trim, translucent-luminous Goodyear tires, and avant-garde (and partly dummy) electronic equipment for the time: piloting controls inspired by aeronautics, automatic emergency braking based on obstacle sensors, electric door opening, voice control, radio, stereo system, tape recorder, television, telephone, and cocktail bar.

It was presented with significant media success in many television programs of the time. and inspired many futuristic concept cars of the era (Ford FX-Atmos 1954, Ford Mystere 1955, Lincoln Futura 1955, Oldsmobile Golden Rocket 1956, and Lincoln Premiere 1956).

Classic car 

It was purchased at an auction from its owner in 2018, and fully restored by Goodyear and the Klairmont Kollections car museum in Chicago, then successfully presented at the 2019 Geneva International Motor Show.

In film 

 1960 Cendrillon aux grands pieds.
 1966 Batman (the Batmobile was designed by George Barris, and inspired by Golden Sahara II)

See also 
 Kustom Kulture

References

External links 

 
 

1950s cars
Kustom Kulture
Concept cars
Lincoln vehicles